The September 11 attacks were a series of four coordinated terrorist attacks in the United States on September 11, 2001.

September 11 attacks may also refer to:
 The Drogheda Massacre during the British Cromwellian conquest of Ireland, from 3rd to 11th September 1649
 Mountain Meadows massacre in Utah, from September 7 to 11, 1857
 1973 Chilean coup d'état, on September 11, 1973
 2012 Benghazi attack, an assault on American facilities in Libya on September 11, 2012

See also
 September 11
 911 (disambiguation)